North Otter Township (T12N R7W) is located in Macoupin County, Illinois, United States. As of the 2010 census, its population was 816 and it contained 449 housing units.

Geography

Demographics

Adjacent townships
 Talkington Township, Sangamon County (north)
 Auburn Township, Sangamon County (northeast)
 Virden Township (east)
 Girard Township (east)
 Nilwood Township (southeast)
 South Otter Township (south)
 South Palmyra Township (southwest)
 North Palmyra Township (west)
 Waverly Township (Road District No. 13), Morgan County, Illinois (northwest)

References

External links
US Census
City-data.com
Illinois State Archives

Townships in Macoupin County, Illinois
Townships in Illinois